The 1997 Men's African Volleyball Championship was held in Lagos, Nigeria, with 8 teams participating in the continental sport championship.

Teams

Results

Final ranking

References
 

1997 Men
African championship, Men
Men's African Volleyball Championship
1997 in Nigerian sport
International volleyball competitions hosted by Nigeria
20th century in Lagos
International sports competitions in Lagos